International Review of Mission (IRM) is a Bi-Annual academic journal covering various aspects of the Christian ministry that began to be published in 1912. It is a periodical by the World Council of Churches. The International Review of Mission (IRM) costs $118 for a yearly subscription and is available in The Americas, Europe, Africa, The Asian Pacific, and Japan.

References

Publications established in 1912
World Council of Churches
Quarterly journals